Medically Yourrs is a 2019 Hindi web series created and produced by Ekta Kapoor for video on demand platform ALTBalaji. The series stars Shantanu Maheshwari and Nityaami Shirke as protagonists and revolves around the plight of a medical students and explores the problems faced by them in the quirkiest possible way.

The series is available for streaming on the ALT Balaji App and its associated websites since its release date.

Plot
The series revolves around a lives of medical students. It explores the problems and issues faced by them.
In series Discuss about bestfriend, and it's friendship.

Cast
 Shantanu Maheshwari as Abir
 Nityaami Shirke as Nibedita
 Keval Dasani as Lolly
 Manas Adhiya as Pallav
 Radhe Lotwala as Vishesh
 Priyanka Arya as Nishta
 Jayna Ruchandani as Nanki
 Mrinal Dutt as Akshay
Ivan Rodrigues as Dr. Komudhi Banerjee (Dean)
 Bijay Anand as Dr. Basu
 Shubhavi Choksey as Mrs. Basu
 Poonam Gurung as Maina
 Trishna Mukherjee
 Shruti Bapna as Chandni Ma'am
 Shuba Rajput as Ruchi
 Annie Singh as Ojeeta
 Vijay Tilani as Bedanto
 Siddharth Sen as Koustub

Episodes

References

External links
 
 

2019 web series debuts
Hindi-language web series
ALTBalaji original programming
Indian drama web series